Herman the German or Hermann the German may refer to:

People
 Nickname of Arminius (18/17 BC–AD 21), the chieftain who led a coalition of Germanic tribes to victory in 9 AD over a Roman army in the Battle of the Teutoburg Forest
 Hermannus Alemannus (Latin for "Herman the German"), translator of the 13th century
 Gerhard Neumann (1917–1997), German-American aviation engineer and executive for General Electric
 Kenny Wallace (born 1963), nickname of NASCAR driver and TV personality
 Ulf Herman (born 1966), nickname of the professional wrestler

Arts and entertainment
 Hermann Heights Monument, a statue of Arminius in New Ulm, Minnesota, US commonly referred to by locals as "Hermann the German"
 Herman the German, a character played by Fred Grandy in the 1975 film Death Race 2000 
 Herman ze German, a 1985 album by Scorpions drummer Herman Rarebell

Other uses
 Herman the German (crane vessel) of a crane vessel (hull classification symbol YD 171) seized from Germany by the US after World War II, later used to lift the Spruce Goose
 Herman ze German, a small German meat products fast food chain in the UK and Germany